Albert Angus Turbayne (May 3, 1866 – April 29, 1940) was an American book designer and bookbinding artist.

Turbayne was born in Boston, Massachusetts. He worked in London for the London County Council School of Photoengraving and Lithography and also for Carlton Studio. Whilst at Carlton, he worked closely with fellow North American émigrés William Tracy Wallace and Norman Mills Price. His principal artistic work was the design of books and bindings. He won a bronze medal (third place) for book binding design at the Exposition Universelle (1900) in Paris.

Turbayne married in London on two occasions. The first in 1906, to Christine Owens and the second, to Millicent Tavener (b. 1884), in 1921. Turbayne and Owens had two sons, William Turbayne (later name change to William Seymour) and John Turbayne, born in 1914, who changed his name to John Seymour.

Turbayne died in London in 1940.

Works

References

External links
 
 
Biographical entry on Royal Academy of Arts Collection website
UNCG American Publishers' Trade Bindings: Albert Angus Turbayne

Bookbinders
1866 births
1940 deaths
Artists from Boston
Book designers
Art Nouveau designers
Art Nouveau illustrators
American illustrators